is a Japanese actress. She was born in Kanagawa Prefecture.

Starting in January 2017, Okubo was represented by Avex Group Holdings Artists Development Division., however, in December 2018 she switched to Wonderwave as her agency. On the 31st of December 2020, she announced that she was moving to HI RANK INDUSTRIES.

Biography
Okubo made her debut as the role of Hammie / Chameleon Green in Uchu Sentai Kyuranger.

Okubo speaks fluent English.

Filmography

TV dramas

Films

Films

References

Actresses from Kanagawa Prefecture
1998 births
Living people